São Jacinto is a civil parish in the municipality of Aveiro, Aveiro District, Portugal. The population in 2011 was 993, in an area of 13.84 km2. It is situated between the Aveiro Lagoon and the Atlantic Ocean. The São Jacinto Dunes Natural Reserve lies north of the village.

Climate
São Jacinto has a warm-summer Mediterranean climate with warm, dry summers and mild, wet winters.

References

Freguesias of Aveiro, Portugal